Capusa senilis, the black-banded wedge-moth, is a moth of the family Geometridae. The species was first described by Francis Walker in 1857. It is found in the south-eastern quarter of Australia.

The larvae feed on Fabaceae, Myrtaceae and Pinaceae species.

References

Nacophorini